WHU commonly refers to:
 Wuhan University, Chinese university
 WHU – Otto Beisheim School of Management, German business school

It may also refer to:
 IATA code for Wuhu Airport, China
 West Ham United F.C., a football club in London
 Welsh Hockey Union
 Wahau Kayan, a dialect of the Kayan people of Borneo (ISO code: whu)